Charles J. Wysocki, Ph.D., is a biologist and psychologist, and an emeritus member of the Monell Chemical Senses Center. He is notable for his work with the genetics of olfaction in mice and humans, the vomeronasal organ and the major histocompatibility complex. He has worked with Drs. George Preti and Gary Beauchamp in the past.

References

External links
Dr. Wysocki's page at Monell's Website

Living people
Year of birth missing (living people)
21st-century American biologists
21st-century American psychologists